Ali Maia (born May 6, 1986 in Jableh, Syria) is a Syrian footballer. He currently plays for Jableh.

International career
Ali Maia is currently a member of the Syria national football team.
He has been a regular for the Syria national football team since 2009. Senior national coach Fajr Ibrahim called him for the first time, and he debuted in a 5 June 2009 friendly against Sierra Leone. He came on as a substitute for Bakri Tarrab in the second halftime.

Appearances for Syrian national team
Results list Syria's goal tally first.

W = Matches won; D = Matches drawn; L = Matches lost

1 Non FIFA 'A' international match

External links
 

1986 births
Living people
Syrian footballers
Syria international footballers
Association football defenders
Syrian Premier League players